The 4th Regiment South Carolina Volunteer Infantry (Colored) was an African-American infantry regiment that served in the Union Army during the American Civil War.

Service
The 4th South Carolina Infantry was organized at Fernandina, Florida and mustered into Federal service in July 1863.

The regiment was consolidated with 3rd South Carolina to form the 21st United States Colored Infantry Regiment on March 14, 1864.

See also

List of Union South Carolina Civil War Units
South Carolina in the American Civil War

Notes

References
The Civil War Archive

Infantry, 004
South Carolina Infantry, 004
Military units and formations established in 1863
1863 establishments in Florida
Military units and formations disestablished in 1864